Petersburg is an unincorporated community on North Carolina Highway 213, in south-central Madison County, North Carolina, United States. It lies at an elevation of 1991 feet (607 m). The community is part of the Asheville Metropolitan Statistical Area.

References

Unincorporated communities in North Carolina
Unincorporated communities in Madison County, North Carolina
Asheville metropolitan area